The National Youth League (NYL) is a Scottish rugby league competition competed for at under-15 and under-17 level. It is administered by Scotland Rugby League. The open age counterpart to the National Youth League is the Rugby League Conference Scotland Division.

2018 structure

Past winners
2010 Under-15: Victoria Knights; Under-17: Easterhouse Panthers

External links

Rugby league in Scotland
Rugby
Junior rugby league
Rugby League Conference
Youth sport in Scotland